Joseph Walton Losey III (January 14, 1909 – June 22, 1984) was an American theatre and film director, producer, and screenwriter. Born in Wisconsin, he studied in Germany with Bertolt Brecht and then returned to the United States. Blacklisted by Hollywood in the 1950s, he moved to Europe where he made the remainder of his films, mostly in the United Kingdom. Among the most critically and commercially successful were the films with screenplays by Harold Pinter: The Servant (1963) and The Go-Between (1971).

Losey's 1976 film Monsieur Klein won the César Awards for Best Film and Best Director. He was a four-time nominee for both the Palme d'Or (winning once) and the Golden Lion, and a two-time BAFTA nominee.

Early life and career 

Joseph Walton Losey III was born on January 14, 1909, in La Crosse, Wisconsin, where he and Nicholas Ray were high-school classmates at La Crosse Central High School. He attended Dartmouth College and Harvard University, beginning as a student of medicine and ending in drama.

Losey became a major figure in New York City political theatre, first directing the controversial failure Little Old Boy in 1933. He declined to direct a staged version of Dodsworth by Sinclair Lewis, which led Lewis to offer him his first work written for the stage, Jayhawker. Losey directed the show, which had a brief run. Bosley Crowther in The New York Times noted that "The play, being increasingly wordy, presents staging problems that Joe Losey's direction does not always solve. It is hard to tell who is responsible for the obscure parts in the story."

He visited the Soviet Union for several months in 1935, to study the Russian stage. In Moscow he participated in a seminar on film taught by Sergei Eisenstein. He also met Bertolt Brecht and the composer Hanns Eisler, who were visiting Moscow at the time.

In 1936, he directed Triple-A Plowed Under on Broadway, a production of the Works Progress Administration's Federal Theatre Project. He then directed the second Living Newspaper presentation, Injunction Granted.

Losey served in the U.S. military during World War II and was discharged in 1945. From 1946 to 1947, Losey worked with Bertolt Brecht—who was living in exile in Los Angeles—and Charles Laughton on the preparations for the staging of Brecht's play Galileo (Life of Galileo) which he and Brecht eventually co-directed with Laughton in the title role, and with music by Eisler. The play premiered on July 30, 1947, at the Coronet Theatre in Beverly Hills. On October 30, 1947, Losey accompanied Brecht to Washington D.C. for Brecht's appearance before the House Un-American Activities Committee (HUAC). Brecht left the US the following day. Losey went on to stage Galileo, again with Laughton in the title role, in New York City where it opened on December 7, 1947, at the Maxine Elliott Theatre. More than 25 years later Losey, in exile in England, would direct a film version of Brecht's play Galileo (1975).

Losey's first feature film was a political allegory titled The Boy with Green Hair (1947), starring a young Dean Stockwell as Peter, a war orphan who is subject to ridicule after he awakens one morning to find his hair mysteriously turned green.

Seymour Nebenzal, the producer of Fritz Lang's classic M (1931), hired Losey to direct a remake set in Los Angeles rather than Berlin. In the new version, released in 1951, the killer's name was changed from Hans Beckert to Martin W. Harrow. Nebenzal's son Harold was associate producer of this version.

Politics and exile
During the 1930s and 1940s, Losey maintained extensive contacts with people on the political left, including radicals and communists or those who would eventually become such. He had collaborated with Bertolt Brecht and had a long association with Hanns Eisler, both targets of HUAC's interest. Losey had written to the Immigration and Naturalization Service in support of a resident visa for Eisler, who had many radical associations. They had collaborated on a "political cabaret" from 1937 to 1939, and Losey had invited Eisler to compose music for a short public-relations film that he had been commissioned to produce for presentation at the 1939 New York World's Fair, Pete Roleum and His Cousins.

Losey had also worked on the Federal Theatre Project, long a target of HUAC. Losey directed the play Triple-A Plowed Under, which been denounced by HUAC's antecedent, the Dies Committee, as communist propaganda. His Hollywood collaborators included a long list of other HUAC targets, including Dalton Trumbo and Ring Lardner Jr.

Losey's first wife Elizabeth Hawes worked with a wide range of communists and anticommunist liberals at the radical newspaper PM. After their divorce in 1944, she wrote about working as a union organizer just after World War II, where "one preferred the Communists to the Red-Baiters." At some point, probably early in the 1940s, the FBI maintained dossiers on both Losey and Hawes, and that of Losey charged that he was a Stalinist agent as of 1945.

In 1946, Losey joined the Communist Party USA. He later explained to a French interviewer:

Losey was under a long-term contract with Dore Schary at RKO when Howard Hughes purchased the company in 1948 and began purging it of leftists. Losey later explained how Hughes tested employees to determine whether they had communist sympathies:

Hughes responded by holding Losey to his contract without assigning him any work. In mid-1949, Schary persuaded Hughes to release Losey, who soon began working as an independent on The Lawless for Paramount Pictures. Soon he was working on a three-picture contract with Stanley Kramer. His name was mentioned by two witnesses before HUAC in the spring of 1951. Losey's attorney suggested arranging a deal with the committee for testimony in secret. Instead, Losey abandoned his work editing The Big Night and left for Europe while his ex-wife Louise departed for Mexico a few days later. HUAC took weeks to try unsuccessfully to serve them with a subpoena compelling their testimony.

After more than a year working on Stranger on the Prowl in Italy, Losey returned to the U.S. on October 12, 1952. He found himself unemployable:

He returned briefly to Rome and settled in London on January 4, 1953.

Career in Europe
Losey settled in Britain and worked as a director of genre films. His first British film The Sleeping Tiger (1954), a noir crime thriller, was made under the pseudonym of Victor Hanbury, because the stars of the film, Alexis Smith and Alexander Knox, feared being blacklisted by Hollywood in turn if it became known they had worked with him. The Intimate Stranger (1956) carried a pseudonym as well. His films covered a wide range from the Regency melodrama The Gypsy and the Gentleman (1958) to the gangster film The Criminal (1960).

Losey was also originally slated to direct the Hammer Films production X the Unknown (1956), but after a few days' work the star Dean Jagger refused to work with a supposed Communist sympathiser and Losey was removed from the project. An alternative version is that Losey was replaced due to illness. Losey was later hired by Hammer Films to direct The Damned, a 1963 British science fiction film based on H.L. Lawrence's novel "The Children of Light".

In the 1960s, Losey began working with playwright Harold Pinter, in what became a long friendship and initiated a successful screenwriting career for Pinter. Losey directed three enduring classics based on Pinter's screenplays: The Servant (1963), Accident (1967) and The Go-Between (1971). The Servant won three British Academy Film Awards. Accident won the Grand Prix Spécial du Jury award at the 1967 Cannes Film Festival. The Go-Between won the Golden Palm Award at the 1971 Cannes Film Festival, four prizes at the 1972 BAFTA awards, and Best British Screenplay at the 1972 Writers' Guild of Great Britain awards. Each of the three films examines the politics of class and sexuality in England at the end of the 19th century (The Go-Between) and in the 1960s. In The Servant, a manservant facilitates the moral and psychological degradation of his privileged and rich employer. Accident explores male lust, hypocrisy and ennui among the educated middle class as two Oxford University tutors competitively objectify a student against the backdrop of their seemingly idyllic lives. In The Go-Between, a young middle-class boy, the summer guest of an upper-class family, becomes the messenger for an affair between a working-class farmer and the daughter of his hosts.

Although Losey's films are generally naturalistic, The Servants hybridisation of Losey's signature Baroque style, film noir, naturalism and expressionism, and both Accidents and The Go-Betweens radical cinematography, use of montage, voice over and musical score, amount to a sophisticated construction of cinematic time and narrative perspective that edges this work in the direction of neorealist cinema. All three films are marked by Pinter's sparse, elliptical and enigmatically subtextual dialogue, something Losey often develops a visual correlate for (and occasionally even works against) by means of dense and cluttered mise-en-scène and peripatetic camera work.

In 1966, Losey directed Modesty Blaise, a comedy spy-fi film produced in the United Kingdom and released worldwide in 1966. Sometimes considered a James Bond parody, it was based loosely on the popular comic strip Modesty Blaise by Peter O'Donnell.'

Losey directed Robert Shaw and Malcolm McDowell in the British action film Figures in a Landscape (1970), adapted by Shaw from the novel by Barry England. The film was shot in various locations in Spain.

Losey also worked with Pinter on The Proust Screenplay (1972), an adaptation of A la recherche du temps perdu by Marcel Proust. Losey died before the project's financing could be assembled.

In 1975, Losey realized a long-planned film adaptation of Brecht's Galileo released as Life of Galileo starring Chaim Topol. Galileo was produced as part of the subscription film series of the American Film Theatre, but shot in the UK. In the context of this production, Losey also made a half-hour film based on Galileo's life.

Losey's Monsieur Klein (1976) examined the day in Occupied France when Jews in and around Paris were arrested for deportation. He said he so completely rejected naturalism in film that in this case he divided his shooting schedule into three "visual categories": Unreality, Reality and Abstract.  He demonstrated a facility for working in the French language and Monsieur Klein (1976) gave Alain Delon as star and producer one of French cinema's earliest chances to highlight the background to the infamous Vel' d'Hiv Roundup of French Jews in July 1942.

In 1979, Losey filmed Mozart's opera Don Giovanni, shot in Villa La Rotonda and the Veneto region of Italy; this film was nominated for several César Awards in 1980, including Best Director.

Personal life
In 1964, Losey told The New York Times: "I'd love to work in America again, but it would have to be just the right thing." He told an interviewer the year before he died that he was not bitter about being blacklisted: "Without it I would have three Cadillacs, two swimming pools and millions of dollars, and I'd be dead. It was terrifying, it was disgusting, but you can get trapped by money and complacency. A good shaking up never did anyone any harm."

Dartmouth College, his alma mater, awarded Losey an honorary degree in 1973. In 1983, the University of Wisconsin–Madison did the same.

Losey married four times and divorced thrice. He married Elizabeth Hawes on July 24, 1937. They had a son, Gavrik Losey, in 1938, but divorced in November 1944. Gavrik helped with the production on some of his father's films. Gavrik's two sons are film directors Marek Losey and Luke Losey.

From 1956 to 1963, Losey was married to British actress Dorothy Bromiley. They had a son, Joshua Losey, born on July 16, 1957, who became an actor. On September 29, 1970, Losey married Patricia Mohan in King's Lynn, Norfolk, shortly after finishing shooting The Go-Between. Patricia Losey went on to adapt Lorenzo Da Ponte's opera libretto for Losey's Don Giovanni and Nell Dunn's play for Steaming.

He died at his home in London on June 22, 1984, following a brief illness, four weeks after completing his last film.

In Guilty by Suspicion, Irwin Winkler's 1991 film about the Hollywood blacklist, McCarthyism, and the activities of the House Un-American Activities Committee, Martin Scorsese plays an American filmmaker named "Joe Lesser" who leaves Hollywood for England rather than face HUAC investigations. The fictional director played by Scorsese is based on Joseph Losey.

Filmography

Awards and nominations

Notes and references

Further reading
 
 Ciment, Michel, Conversations with Losey (New York: Methuen, 1985); originally published as  Ciment, Michel, Le Livre de Losey. Entretiens avec le cinéaste (Paris: Stock/Cinéma, 1979)
  Ciment, Michel, Joseph Losey: l'oeil du Maître (Institut Lumière/Actes Sud, 1994)
 Cohen, Robert, "Bertolt Brecht, Joseph Losey, and Brechtian Cinema". "Escape to Life": German Intellectuals in New York: A Compendium on Exile after 1933. Eckart Goebel and Sigrid Weigel (eds.). De Gruyter, 2012. 142-161. 
 DeRahm, Edith, Joseph Losey: An American Director in Exile (Pharos, 1995)
 Hirsch, Foster, Joseph Losey (Twayne, 1980)
 Houston, Penelope, "Losey's Paper Handkerchief", Sight and Sound, Summer 1966
 Jacob, Gilles, "Joseph Losey, or The Camera Calls", Sight and Sound, Spring 1966
 Leahy, James, The Cinema of Joseph Losey (A. S. Barnes, 1967)
  Ledieu, Christian, Joseph Losey (Seghers, 1963)
 Palmer, Palmer and Michael Riley, The Films of Joseph Losey (Cambridge University Press, 1993)
  Vallet, Joaquín, Joseph Losey (Cátedra, 2010)

External links

Filmography at BFI Film & TV Database

A Child Went Forth at Archive.org
Robert Maras, "Dissecting class relations: The film collaborations of Joseph Losey and Harold Pinter", May 28, 2012

1909 births
1984 deaths
American expatriates in England
American expatriates in Italy
American theatre directors
Best Director César Award winners
Dartmouth College alumni
David di Donatello winners
Directors of Palme d'Or winners
Film directors from Wisconsin
Harvard University alumni
Hollywood blacklist
La Crosse Central High School alumni
Members of the Communist Party USA
Military personnel from Wisconsin
People from La Crosse, Wisconsin
Federal Theatre Project people
Victims of McCarthyism
United States Army personnel of World War II
United States Army soldiers